"Away from Me" is the lead single from Puddle of Mudd's Life on Display album. Wes Scantlin mentioned in an interview with VH1 that "Away from Me" was written about how he was lied to and deceived in a relationship.

A music video was created for the song, and can be found on the Life on Display CD when inserted into a computer's CD drive. The song is also one of Puddle of Mudd's most successful songs, charting the highest of any song on the Life on Display album. It hit #1 on the Mainstream Rock Tracks chart, where it stayed for three weeks, in addition to reaching #5 on the Modern Rock Tracks chart, and #72 on the Billboard Hot 100. It was featured in an episode of The O.C. in 2004.

Single

Track listings

US Promo Only

Europe Promo Only

UK Limited Edition 7" Blue Vinyl

UK Maxi Single

UK Enhanced Single

Charts

See also 
 List of Billboard Mainstream Rock number-one songs of the 2000s

References

External links

Puddle of Mudd songs
2003 singles
2003 songs
Songs written by Wes Scantlin
Geffen Records singles